Levnesovia is a genus of hadrosauroid dinosaur from the Late Cretaceous Bissekty Formation of Uzbekistan.  It was related to Bactrosaurus.  The type species is L. transoxiana. The genus name honours the late Russian paleontologist Lev Nesov, and the specific name refers to the ancient region Transoxiana. It is known from the minority of the skull and would have reached around two meters in length.

See also 
 Timeline of hadrosaur research

References 

Hadrosaurs
Turonian life
Late Cretaceous dinosaurs of Asia
Fossils of Uzbekistan
Bissekty Formation
Fossil taxa described in 2009
Taxa named by Hans-Dieter Sues
Ornithischian genera